Hignett or Hignet is a surname. Notable people with the surname include:

Alan Hignett (born 1946), English footballer
Craig Hignett (born 1970), English footballer
John Hignett (1900–1994), English Equerry to Edward VIII
Mary Hignett (1915–1980), British actress
Mathilde Hignet (born 1993), French politician
Richard Hignett (born 1972), English cricketer
Sam Hignett (1885 – c. 1933), English footballer